Jacques Demierre (born 4 January 1954, in Geneva) is a Swiss improvisation musician and composer.

Life and works 
Soon, he gave up the classic piano and tended to the avant-garde rock and improvised jazz. Sylvie Courvoisier,  and Michel Wintsch were his students.

Demierre changed his way as a composer to the border of jazz, free improvisation and contemporary music, because he was interested in mixing the improvised music tradition with notated music.

References

External links 
 
 Profile, www.musinfo.ch (in French)
 "The many sides of pianist Jacques Demierre: solo, duo and trio" by John Eyles, 30 January 2009, www.allaboutjazz.com

20th-century Swiss musicians
Avant-garde jazz pianists
1954 births
Living people
Musicians from Geneva
Intakt Records artists